Çamlıca is a Turkish place name and may refer to:

Populated places 
Çamlıca, Adıyaman, a village in the central district
Çamlıca, Alanya, a village in Alanya district of Antalya Province
Çamlıca, Antalya, a village in the central district of Antalya Province
Çamlıca, Aziziye
Çamlıca, Besni, a village in Adıyaman Province
Çamlıca, Ezine
Çamlıca, Gazipaşa, a village in Gazipaşa district of Antalya Province
Çamlıca, Göynük, a village in Bolu Province
Çamlıca, İnebolu, a village
Çamlıca, Istanbul, a neighborhood in the district of Üsküdar encompassing Çamlıca Hill
Çamlıca, Kaynaşlı
Çamlıca, Keşan, a municipality in Edirne Province
Çamlıca, Kozluk, a village in Batman Province
Çamlıca, Laçin
Çamlıca, Merzifon, a village in Amasya Province
Çamlıca, Mustafakemalpaşa
Çamlıca, Mut, a village in Mut district of Mersin Province
Çamlıca, Pasinler
Çamlıca, Silifke, a village in Silifke district of Mersin Province
Çamlıca, Şavşat, a village in Şavşat district of Artvin Province
Çamlıca, Üzümlü
Çamlıca, Vezirköprü, a village in Samsun Province
Çamlıca, Yahyalı, a village in Kayseri Province
Çamlıca, Yüreğir, a village in Adana Province
Çamlıca, Yusufeli, a village in Yusufeli district of Artvin Province
"Çamlıca", the Turkish name for Goufes, a village in northern Cyprus

Other places 
Çamlıca Hill, one of the seven hills of Istanbul
Çamlıca Republic Mosque, built in Istanbul in 2016